San Bartolomé Ayautla  Tierra del Achiote y el Mamey is a town and municipality in Oaxaca in south-western Mexico. The municipality covers an area of 118.65 km². 
It is part of the Teotitlán District in the north of the Cañada Region.

As of 2005, the municipality had a total population of 3713.

References 

Municipalities of Oaxaca